D'Annunzio (internationally released as D'Annunzio and I and Love Sin) is a 1987 Italian biographical film directed by Sergio Nasca.

Plot summary 
The film focuses on Decadentism, that developed in France and Italy in the late 19th century. Gabriele d'Annunzio is a renowned poet, coming from the rural region of Abruzzo, from the seaside town of Pescara. He is already famous for his aesthetic poetry, and he's also a journalist in Rome. There d'Annunzio begins to spend his days in worldly pleasure, living purely in the art world and in high society. He hates democracy, hates mass culture even more, and looks for passion and pleasure in the rich ladies of the court; until he meets Lady Elvira Fraternali Leoni, known affectionately as "Barbara". This love affair arouses in d'Annunzio the inspiration for the writing of his first great novel of Decadentism: Pleasure (Il Piacere).

Background
While in Rome between 1891 and 1897, Emil Fuchs had an affair with Elvira Fraternali, and this affair is one of the sources for the plot.

Cast 
Robert Powell  as Gabriele D'Annunzio
Stefania Sandrelli  as Elvira Fraternali Leoni, called Barbara
Laurent Terzieff  as Michetti
Florence Guérin  as Clo Albrini
Sonia Petrovna  as Maria Cruyllas di Gravina
Teresa Ann Savoy  as Maria di Gallese
Fiorenza Marchegiani  as Olga Ossani
Paolo Bonacelli  as Ercole Leoni
Roberto Alpi  as Edoardo Scarfoglio
Cesare Barbetti  as De Bosis
Eva Grimaldi  as Viola

Release
The film was released in Italy on February 3, 1987.

See also  
 List of Italian films of 1987

References

External links

1987 films
1980s biographical drama films
Biographical films about writers
Cultural depictions of Gabriele D'Annunzio
Italian biographical drama films
1987 drama films
1980s Italian-language films
English-language Italian films
1980s English-language films
Films set in Pescara
Films shot in Pescara
1987 multilingual films
Italian multilingual films
1980s Italian films